Mika Marila (born 9 February 1973 in Janakkala) is a Finnish former alpine skier who competed in the 1994 Winter Olympics and 1998 Winter Olympics.

External links
 sports-reference.com

1973 births
Living people
Finnish male alpine skiers
Olympic alpine skiers of Finland
Alpine skiers at the 1994 Winter Olympics
Alpine skiers at the 1998 Winter Olympics
People from Janakkala
Sportspeople from Kanta-Häme